The First Bettel–Schneider Ministry (or Bettel–Schneider Ministry I) was the ruling government of Luxembourg from 4 December 2013 to 5 December 2018. It was led by Prime Minister Xavier Bettel and Deputy Prime Minister Etienne Schneider. It was formed on 4 December 2013, after the 2013 election which saw all 60 seats in the Chamber of Deputies renewed. The government was a traffic light coalition between the Democratic Party (DP), the Luxembourg Socialist Workers' Party (LSAP) and The Greens. It was succeeded by Bettel–Schneider Ministry II on 5 December 2018.

Formation 
Until 2013, Luxembourg was governed by a CSV–LSAP coalition under Jean-Claude Juncker. After concerns over political oversight of the intelligence agency of Luxembourg, the Service de Renseignement de l'État, the LSAP withdrew its support from the government. Juncker then resigned as prime minister on 11 July 2013 and asked the Grand-Duke to dissolve the Chamber of Deputies and call an election. In the election held on 20 October 2013, the CSV lost some seats but still remained as the largest party in parliament, though without a majority of seats. However, representatives of the DP, LSAP and the Greens agreed to form a government on election night, after the results had been announced. Coalition talks started within a few days, and the coalition agreement was announced one and a half months later, and the new government was sworn in on 4 December 2013. This was only the second government since 1945 that did not involve the CSV. It was also the first time the Greens were involved in government. The three parties had a majority of 32 seats out of 60 in the Chamber of Deputies. Due to the colours associated with the 3 parties (red, blue and green) the arrangement was known as a "Gambia coalition" among some commentators, as it reflected that country's flag.

Overview 
In general, the government had two main priorities, curbing the budget deficit, and in the area of social policy. In terms of the former, the government raised the basic rate of VAT from 15 to 17 percent from 1 January 2015.

Same-sex marriage was made legal from 1 January 2015.

On 11 September 2014 the Deputy Prime Minister Etienne Schneider announced plans to introduce a church tax, payable only by members of religious congregations; the churches would then have to pay their clergy's salaries themselves. This would have replaced the system of the clergy being paid by the state.

From November 2014, the government had to deal with the LuxLeaks scandal.

On 7 June 2015, the government held a constitutional referendum, asking, amongst other things, whether residents of Luxembourg without Luxembourgish nationality should be allowed to vote in national elections. While all 3 parties in the government coalition campaigned for a "Yes" vote, the result was an overwhelming "No".

Composition 

Secretaries of State:

On 16 December 2015, Maggy Nagel resigned as Minister for Housing and Minister for Culture. Xavier Bettel announced that he would take over as Minister for Culture, while Marc Hansen, hitherto a Secretary of State, would be made Minister for Housing.

References 

Government of Luxembourg
Ministries of Luxembourg
Cabinets established in 2013
Cabinets disestablished in 2018